Nizhneye Tukbayevo (Tübänge Tuqbay) is a rural locality (a village) in Duvan-Mechetlinsky Selsoviet, Mechetlinsky District, Bashkortostan, Russia. The population was 227 as of 2010. There are 6 streets.

Geography 
Nizhneye Tukbayevo is located 44 km south of Bolsheustyikinskoye (the district's administrative centre) by road. Buranchino is the nearest rural locality.

References 

Rural localities in Mechetlinsky District